Thomas Cornelius Brennan KC (1866 – 3 January 1944) was an Australian journalist, lawyer and conservative politician who was elected to the Australian Senate.

Early life
Brennan was born at Sedgwick, near Bendigo, Victoria and was an older brother of Frank Brennan, later Attorney-General in the Scullin Labor government.  He was educated locally and apprenticed as a typesetter with the Bendigo Independent.  He joined the Melbourne Argus as a printer but subsequently became a journalist and sub-editor.  He continued his education part-time, matriculated and earned a law degree at the University of Melbourne in 1900.  He married Florence Margaret Slattery in 1902 and was admitted to the bar in 1907.

Legal career
In 1921 he represented Colin Campbell Ross, the accused in the notorious Gun Alley Murder. Brennan was firmly convinced that Ross was innocent and tried in vain to appeal the case up to the Privy Council. Ross was nonetheless convicted and executed the following year. Haunted by guilt over his failure to save his client, Brennan wrote a book detailing his perspectives on the case, The Gun Alley Murder. It was not until 2008 that modern DNA testing finally confirmed Ross's innocence. The case remains one of the most famous instances of miscarriage of justice in Australian legal history.

He was appointed a King's Counsel (KC) in 1928 and was made a Doctor of Laws in 1935 for a thesis published as Interpreting the Constitution.  Brennan was prominent in the Catholic community and editor of the Catholic Advocate from 1915 to 1917, when he clashed with Bishop Daniel Mannix, who opposed the introduction of conscription during World War I, like the great majority of the Irish Australian Catholic community.

Political career

Brennan ran unsuccessfully as a Liberal for election to the Victorian Legislative Assembly in 1911, 1913 and 1914.  He also ran unsuccessfully as a Nationalist for the seat of Bendigo East in 1921.  In 1931, he was appointed to a fill a casual vacancy in the Senate, representing the United Australia Party in 1931 and gained re-election in the 1931 election.  He was appointed minister without portfolio assisting the ministers for commerce in the second and third Lyons ministries from October 1934 until he lost his seat at the November 1937 election.

Brennan was survived by his wife and two daughters.

Notes

Australian barristers
United Australia Party members of the Parliament of Australia
Members of the Australian Senate
Members of the Australian Senate for Victoria
Members of the Cabinet of Australia
Journalists from Melbourne
1866 births
1944 deaths
Australian King's Counsel
20th-century Australian politicians
People from Bendigo
Australian people of Irish descent
University of Melbourne alumni politicians